Saint-Raphaël is an arrondissement in the Nord department of Haiti. As of 2015, the population was 169,867 inhabitants. Postal codes in the Saint-Raphaël Arrondissement start with the number 14.

Communes
The arrondissement consists of the following communes:
 Dondon
 La Victoire
 Pignon
 Ranquitte
 Saint-Raphaël

History
In the wake of the 2010 Haiti earthquake, food had become short in supply. On 31 January 2010, a food shipment sent through the Pignon Airport, for an orphanage in the commune of Pignon, was looted just after leaving the airport gates. A negotiation between aide shippers and the local mayor lead to a partitioning of food aide between the orphanage and the rest of the population.

References

Arrondissements of Haiti
Nord (Haitian department)